Aleksandr Vladimirovich Tumenko (born 15 July 1983) is a Russian former professional footballer.

Club career
He made his debut in the Russian Premier League in 2004 for FC Shinnik Yaroslavl.

Personal life
He is the brother of Dmitri Tumenko.

References

1983 births
Sportspeople from Budapest
Living people
Russian footballers
FC Shinnik Yaroslavl players
FC Baltika Kaliningrad players
Russian Premier League players
FC Mostransgaz Gazoprovod players
Association football midfielders
FC Spartak Moscow players
FC Fakel Voronezh players
FC MVD Rossii Moscow players